Olivier Sedra is a public address announcer for the Brooklyn Nets of the National Basketball Association. He was the public address announcer for the 2016 NBA Finals champions Cleveland Cavaliers. His style of announcing is a combination of Lawrence Tanter of the Los Angeles Lakers and his hero, Montreal Canadiens public address announcer Michel Lacroix. He is known for his baritone voice and precise yet exciting announcements.

Sedra, who replaced Ronnie "Slam" Duncan after the 2005-06 NBA season, made his debut as the Quicken Loans Arena voice for Cavs games on October 31, 2006. He was selected to announce basketball games for the 2008 Summer Olympics in Beijing, 2017 NBA All-star practices, 2019 NBA All Star Saturday Night, and the 2020 NBA Bubble (including the 2020 NBA Finals).

When Sedra was the announcer in Cleveland, pregame introductions were handled by the Cavs' "hypeman", Ahmaad Crump, who also served as one of the in-arena hosts at Quicken Loans Arena alongside Nicole Marcellino. However, with the Brooklyn Nets, Sedra handles the pregame introductions himself.

Facts

 Olivier Sedra is a native of Montréal, Québec, Canada.
 Olivier Sedra speaks French and English fluently.
 Olivier Sedra went to Vanier College in Montreal.
 Olivier Sedra was selected by the International Basketball Federation (FIBA) to be the voice for the basketball venue at the 2008 Beijing Olympics.
 While he was in Cleveland, Olivier Sedra was also the in-arena host for the Cleveland Monsters of the American Hockey League.

External links
 http://www.nba.com/cavaliers/news/announcer_china_080206.html
 http://media.www.theconcordian.com/media/storage/paper290/news/2008/01/15/Sports/Making.All.The.Right.Calls-3152931.shtml

Living people
Year of birth missing (living people)
Cleveland Cavaliers
National Basketball Association public address announcers
Cleveland Monsters
Canadian sports announcers